Ludham is a village and civil parish in the English county of Norfolk, in the Norfolk Broads, at the end of a dyke leading to Womack Water and flowing into the River Thurne.
For the purposes of local government, it falls within the district of North Norfolk.

The villages name origin is unsure possibly, 'Luda's homestead/village' but perhaps, 'homestead/village on the Hlude (= noisy one)', an old name for Womack Water.

It is part of the Ludham - Potter Heigham NNR, a national nature reserve.

It also effectively gives its name to the preceding age/underlying stage known as the Pre-Ludhamian.

RAF Ludham

The airfield at Ludham was built by Richard Costain Ltd and became operational in November 1941 as a second satellite for the main fighter station at RAF Coltishall sited north of Norwich, three tarmac-covered concrete runways and ancillary buildings being built on the land which had belonged to Fritton Farm. A total of ten RAF fighter squadrons (eight flying various marks of Supermarine Spitfire and two flying the Hawker Typhoon 1b) were based here between December 1941 and July 1945.

Film location
Ludham was one of the film locations for the 1954 movie Conflict of Wings starring John Gregson and Muriel Pavlow. Adapted from the novel by Don Sharp, the story takes place in a Norfolk country village where the locals decide to fight against a proposal to build an air-firing range on an island used as a bird sanctuary.

Filming took place in the village centre, and shows many buildings and features (including the Bakers Arms pub and the very narrow main road through the village) which no longer exist.

A photograph showing filming and more information about Ludham can be accessed at the Ludham Community Archive website.

Notable residents
John Johnson, clergyman and author, was born at Ludham. 
Edward Seago, the landscape artist, lived in the village at the Grade II listed Dutch House.
Actors Athene Seyler and Nicholas "Beau" Hannen owned a country property in the village in the later years of their life.
Kieron Williamson, the boy artist known as "mini Monet", lives locally with his family.

Notes

 http://kepn.nottingham.ac.uk/map/place/Norfolk/Ludham

External links
The Ludham Archive

 
Villages in Norfolk
Civil parishes in Norfolk
North Norfolk